"Hrafntinna" (Icelandic for "Obsidian") is a song written and recorded by Icelandic post-rock band Sigur Rós for their seventh studio album Kveikur. It appears as the second track on the album. The song appeared on the Icelandic Tónlist chart in the week of the release of Kveikur, thanks to strong digital sales of the album, which debuted at #1 on the Tonlist album charts. The song peaked at #29.

Live performances
"Hrafntinna" was one of four tracks played from Kveikur during the Sigur Rós World Tour to be played before the release of the album. It was first played at the Coliseu do Porto in Porto, Portugal on February 13, 2013, and has become a staple part of the setlist for the rest of the tour, usually appearing near the beginning or at the middle of a setlist. Like most tracks from Kveikur played live on the tour, "Hrafntinna" is played with a three-piece brass and five-piece string orchestra as featured on the album. Sigur Ros performed the song live in an episode of Empty Space for French website La Blogothèque in September 2013.

Personnel
Adapted from Kveikur liner notes.

Sigur Rós
Jón Þór Birgisson – vocals, guitar
Georg Hólm – bass
Orri Páll Dýrason – drums

Additional musicians
Eiríkur Orri Ólafsson - brass arrangement
Daníel Bjarnason - string arrangement
Sigrún Jónsdóttir - brass
Eiríkur Orri Ólafsson - brass
Bergrún Snæbjörnsdóttir - brass
Borgar Magnason - strings
Margrét Árnadóttir - strings
Pálína Árnadóttir - strings
Una Sveinbjarnardóttir - strings
Þórunn Ósk Marinósdóttir - strings

Additional personnel
Ted Jensen - mastering
Rich Costey - mixing
Alex Somers - mixing, recording
Elisabeth Carlsson - assistant mixing
Eric Isip - assistant mixing
Chris Kasych - assistant mixing 
Laura Sisk - assistant mixing
Birgir Jón Birgisson - recording
Valgeir Sigurdsson - recording (strings)

Charts

References

Sigur Rós songs
2013 songs
Songs written by Jónsi
Songs written by Orri Páll Dýrason
Songs written by Georg Hólm